Lost in America is a 1985 satirical road comedy film directed by Albert Brooks.

Lost in America may also refer to:

Music
 Lost in America (RTZ album), a 2005 reissue of RTZ's album Lost
 Lost in America (Pavlov's Dog album), 1990
 Lost in America (Edwin McCain album), 2006, or the title song
 Lost in America, a 1996 album by The Gathering Field, or the title song of the album
 "Lost in America" (Alice Cooper song), 1994
 "Lost in America" (Ross Mintzer song), 2013

Film and television
 "Lost in America" (ER), 2006 episode of ER
 Lost in America (2018 film), documentary feature film by director Rotimi Rainwater